Long Live Egypt is an electoral alliance in Egypt that will compete in the 2015 Egyptian parliamentary election.

Affiliated parties 
 New Dawn Party
 Egyptian Revolution Party

References

2014 establishments in Egypt
Political party alliances in Egypt
Political parties established in 2014